Events from the year 1800 in Scotland.

Incumbents

Law officers 
 Lord Advocate – Robert Dundas of Arniston
 Solicitor General for Scotland – Robert Blair

Judiciary 
 Lord President of the Court of Session – Lord Succoth
 Lord Justice General – The Duke of Montrose
 Lord Justice Clerk – Lord Eskgrove

Events 
 1 January – Robert Owen becomes manager of the New Lanark spinning mills.
 15 February – "Meal mob" riot over bread prices in Glasgow.
 30 June – Glasgow Police Act authorises creation of the City of Glasgow Police, which first musters on 15 November.
 August – the 93rd (Sutherland Highlanders) Regiment of Foot is first mustered by William Wemyss at Strathnaver; in September they are sent from Fort George via Aberdeen to Guernsey and in October formally gazetted into the British Army.
 Royal Cornhill Hospital established as Aberdeen Lunatic Asylum.
 Legbrannock Waggonway opened by William Dixon (senior) to move coal from Legbrannock colliery on the Woodhall Estate to the Monkland Canal at Calderbank, an early example of a railway in Scotland.
 New bridges built at Thurso and Wick and Sir John Sinclair plans development of Thurso.
 Approximate date
 Planned village and pier at Inchyra in the Carse of Gowrie built.
 Preston Hall, Midlothian, completed.

Births 
 12 January – Duncan McLaren, Liberal politician (died 1886)
 23 February – William Jardine, naturalist (died 1874 on the Isle of Wight)
 10 April (bapt.) – George Moir, lawyer (died 1870)
 16 April – William Chambers, publisher (died 1883)
 17 April – Catherine Sinclair, novelist (died 1864 in London)
 22 April – Ralph Robb, Free Church minister in Canada (died 1850 in Canada)
 26 April – Elizabeth Sinclair, born Eliza McHutcheson, pioneer in Pacific colonies (died 1892 in Hawaii)
 4 May – John McLeod Campbell, Reformed theologian (died 1872)
 11 July – Charles Lees, portrait painter (died 1880)
 3 September – James Braidwood, firefighter (killed firefighting 1861 in London)
 14 October – Charles Neaves, judge and poet (died 1876)
 24 October – Alexander Gibson, surgeon and forest conservator in India (died 1867)
 Leitch Ritchie, writer (died 1865 in London)

Deaths 
 30 January – William Forsyth, merchant (born 1722)
 16 March – David Doig, educator and writer (born 1719)
 8 April – James Stuart-Mackenzie, politician and astronomer (born c.1719)
 27 December – Hugh Blair, Presbyterian preacher and man of letters (born 1718)
 30 December – Duke Gordon, librarian (born 1739)

The arts
 14 June – Friedrich Schiller's historical drama Mary Stuart has its première in Weimar.
 27 November – Walter Scott's first original poems, "Glenfinlas" and "The Eve of St. John", are published.
 The Works of Robert Burns is published posthumously.

See also 
 1800 in Great Britain

References 

 
Years of the 18th century in Scotland